Kim Keun-bae (born August 7, 1986) is a South Korean football goalkeeper who plays for Jeju United.

On November 18, 2008, Kim was as one of sixteen priority member, he joined Gangwon FC. He made his debut for Gangwon against Daegu FC on April 8, 2009 in league cup match. His first league match for Gangwon against Suwon Bluewings on September 6, 2009.

Club career statistics

References

External links
 

1986 births
Living people
South Korean footballers
Gangwon FC players
Gimcheon Sangmu FC players
Seongnam FC players
Daejeon Hana Citizen FC players
Gimpo FC players
Jeju United FC players
K League 1 players
K League 2 players
Association football goalkeepers